The Medog horned toad (Xenophrys medogensis), or Medog spadefoot toad, is a species of frog in the family Megophryidae. It was described as a subspecies of Omei horned toad (Megophrys omeimontis) based on specimens collected from Mêdog County, Tibet (China); it is still only known from its type locality. It probably has a wider distribution that may reach India. Its natural habitats are subtropical or tropical moist lowland forests, subtropical or tropical moist montane forests, and rivers.

References

Xenophrys
Amphibians of China
Endemic fauna of Tibet
Taxonomy articles created by Polbot
Amphibians described in 1983